Manuel Arzú y Delgado y Nájera (1775 – 15 February 1835) was a Mexican and Nicaraguan military officer who held the position of interim governor of Nicaragua in 1825.

Biography 

Manuel Arzú y Delgado y Nájera was born in 1775 in New Spain. He served for the Spanish Empire as a military officer. In 1822, while serving for the First Mexican Empire, Arzú was placed in charge of a military force and was tasked with suppressing Salvadoran resistance to Mexican annexation. His forces captured San Salvador on 5 April 1822 and forced its defenders to abandon the city.

In 1824, while serving for the Federal Republic of Central America, Arzú commanded federal soldiers to crush a rebellion in Nicaragua led by José Anacleto Ordóñez. After he crushed the rebellion, he was named as Nicaragua's interim governor from 4 January 1825 until 2 April 1825, when he was replaced with Manuel Antonio de la Cerda.

He established Guatemala's first military academy.

References 

1775 births
1835 deaths